Kyle Langford (born 30 July 1989) is an Australian sailor who has competed in multiple America's Cups

Langford is a member of Oracle Racing and in 2010 won the RC44 World Championships in a crew skippered by Jimmy Spithill. He was a late addition to the sailing crew for the 2013 America's Cup. Langford was appointed as the wing trimmer following the suspension of Dirk de Ridder.

He again sailed with Oracle during the 2015–16 America's Cup World Series and the 2017 America's Cup.

Langford sailed in the 2011 Extreme Sailing Series with The Wave, Muscat and the 2014 Extreme Sailing Series with Oman Sail.

Langford will sail on Team Brunel in the 2017–18 Volvo Ocean Race.

References

1989 births
Living people
Australian male sailors (sport)
2013 America's Cup sailors
2017 America's Cup sailors
Oracle Racing sailors
Extreme Sailing Series sailors
Volvo Ocean Race sailors
RC44 class world champions
World champions in sailing for Australia
Sportspeople from Newcastle, New South Wales
21st-century Australian people